Banfu is a town situated at the southern periphery of the city of Zhongshan, Guangdong province.

See also
Shatian dialect

External links
Banfu Government Website

Zhongshan
Towns in Guangdong